Lick Creek is a tributary of Shamokin Creek in Northumberland County, Pennsylvania, in the United States. The creek is not designated as impaired and its watershed is designated as a Coldwater Fishery and a Migratory Fishery. It supports some aquatic life.

Course

Lick Creek begins in a valley on a ridge in Shamokin Township. It flows east-northeast for several tenths of a mile before turning north and receiving an unnamed tributary from the right. The creek then turns north for a few tenths of a mile, entering a much broader valley and receiving an unnamed tributary from the left. The creek then turns east for more than a mile and receives two more unnamed tributaries from the left before turning north-northeast and then east. It then turns northeast for a short distance and crosses Pennsylvania Route 61 before reaching its confluence with Shamokin Creek.

Tributaries
Lick Creek has no named tributaries. However, it does have a number of unnamed tributaries. At least one of these is intermittent.

Hydrology, geography and geology

Lick Creek is not impacted by mining. The creek has a relatively high level of water quality. All streams in the creek's watershed meet at least one designated use and none are impaired.

Watershed
The mouth of the creek is in the United States Geological Survey quadrangle of Shamokin. However, its source is in the quadrangle of Trevorton.

The watershed of Lick Creek is in the lower part of the Shamokin Creek drainage basin and in the middle of the latter watershed's northern part.

History
Lick Creek was entered into the Geographic Names Information System on August 2, 1979. Its identifier in the Geographic Names Information System is 1179280.

Biology
The drainage basin of Lick Creek is designated as a Coldwater Fishery and a Migratory Fishery. Some aquatic life exists in the creek and it historically contained a healthy aquatic community.

See also
Little Shamokin Creek, next tributary of Shamokin Creek going downstream
Millers Run, next tributary of Shamokin Creek going upstream
List of rivers of Pennsylvania
List of tributaries of Shamokin Creek

References

Rivers of Northumberland County, Pennsylvania
Tributaries of Shamokin Creek
Rivers of Pennsylvania